Sheba is a 1919 British silent drama film directed by Cecil M. Hepworth and starring Alma Taylor, Gerald Ames and James Carew. The film is notable for an early appearance of Ronald Colman in a small part. It was made by Hepworth Pictures at Walton Studios.

Cast
 Alma Taylor as Sheba Ormatroyd  
 Gerald Ames as Paul Meredith  
 James Carew as Levison  
 Lionelle Howard as Count Pharamend  
 Eileen Dennes as Bessie Saxton 
 Mary Dibley as Rhoda Meredith  
 Diana Carey as Mrs. Ormatroyd  
 Eric Barker as Rex Ormatroyd 
 Jacky Craine as Baby Paul  
 Ronald Colman as Bit part

References

Bibliography
 Goble, Alan. The Complete Index to Literary Sources in Film. Walter de Gruyter, 1999.

External links

1919 films
1919 drama films
British silent feature films
British drama films
Films directed by Cecil Hepworth
Hepworth Pictures films
Films shot at Nettlefold Studios
British black-and-white films
1910s English-language films
1910s British films
Silent drama films